Arno Breker (19 July 1900 – 13 February 1991) was a German architect and sculptor who is best known for his public works in Nazi Germany, where they were endorsed by the authorities as the antithesis of degenerate art. He was made official state sculptor, and exempted from military service. One of his better known statues is Die Partei, representing the spirit of the Nazi Party that flanked one side of the carriage entrance to Albert Speer's new Reich Chancellery.

After the fall of Nazi Germany in 1945 Breker continued to thrive professionally as a sculptor in the new West Germany.

Life 

Breker was born in Elberfeld, in the west of Germany, the son of stonemason Arnold Breker. He began to study architecture, along with stone-carving and anatomy. At age 20 he entered the Düsseldorf Academy of Arts where he concentrated on sculpture, studying under Hubert Netzer and Wilhelm Kreis. He first visited Paris in 1924, shortly before finishing his studies. There he met with Jean Cocteau, Jean Renoir, Pablo Picasso, Daniel-Henry Kahnweiler, and Alfred Flechtheim. In 1927 he moved to Paris, which he thereafter considered to be his home, in the same year he had an exhibition with Alf Bayrle. Breker was quickly accepted by the art dealer Alfred Flechtheim. He also established close relationships with important figures in the art world, including Charles Despiau, Isamu Noguchi, Maurice de Vlaminck and André Dunoyer de Segonzac, all of whom he later portrayed. He travelled to North Africa, producing lithographs which he published under the title "Tunisian Journey". He also visited Aristide Maillol, who was later to describe Breker as "Germany's Michelangelo".

In 1932, he was awarded a prize by the Prussian Ministry of Culture, which allowed him to stay in Rome for a year. In 1934 he returned to Germany on the advice of Max Liebermann. At this time Alfred Rosenberg, editor of the Nazi newspaper Völkischer Beobachter, actually denounced some of Breker's work as degenerate art. However, Breker was supported by many Nazi leaders, especially Adolf Hitler. Even Rosenberg later hailed his sculptures as expressions of the "mighty momentum and will power" ("Wucht und Willenhaftigkeit") of Nazi Germany. He took commissions from the Nazis from 1933 through 1942, for example participating in a show of his work in occupied Paris in 1942, where he met Jean Cocteau, who appreciated his work. He maintained personal relationships with Albert Speer and with Hitler. In 1936 he won the commission for two sculptures representing athletic prowess, to be entered in the 1936 Olympic games arts competition in Berlin, one representing a Decathlete ("Zehnkämpfer"), which won the silver medal for statues, and the other The Victress ("Die Siegerin"). In 1937 he married Demetra Messala (Δήμητρα Μεσσάλα), a Greek model. The same year, Breker joined the Nazi Party and was made "official state sculptor" by Hitler, given a large property and provided a studio with forty-three assistants. Breker was on a list of 378 "Gottbegnadeten" (divinely gifted) artists exempted from wartime military duty by Hitler and  chief propagandist Joseph Goebbels. His twin sculptures The Party and The Army held a prominent position at the entrance to Albert Speer's new Reich Chancellery, as well as the "Striding Horses" (1939), which until 1945 flanked the entrance stairs on the garden front of Adolf Hitler's Reich Chancellery in Berlin.

The neoclassical nature of his work, with titles like Comradeship, Torchbearer, and Sacrifice, typified Nazi ideals, and suited the characteristics of Nazi architecture. On closer inspection, though, the proportions of his figures, the highly colouristic treatment of his surfaces (the strong contrasts between dark and light accents), and the melodramatic tension of their musculatures perhaps invites comparison with the Italian Mannerist sculptors of the 16th century. This Mannerist tendency to Breker's neoclassicism may suggest closer affinities to concurrent expressionist tendencies in German Modernism than is acknowledged.

Until the fall of the Third Reich, Breker was a professor of visual arts in Berlin.

Post-Nazi career

Ninety percent of Breker's public works were destroyed during the bombings of Germany toward the end of the war. In 1946, Breker was offered a commission by Soviet leader Joseph Stalin, but he refused, saying "One dictatorship is sufficient for me". In 1948 Breker was designated as a "fellow traveller" of the Nazis and fired, despite which he continued to thrive professionally. He returned to Düsseldorf, now in the new West Germany, which remained his base, with periods of residence in Paris. During this time he worked as an architect. However, he continued to receive commissions for sculptures, producing a number of works in his familiar classical style, working for businesses and individual patrons. He also produced many portrait busts. In 1970 he was commissioned by the king of Morocco to produce work for the United Nations Building in Casablanca, but the work was destroyed. Many other works followed, including sculptures for Dusseldorf's city hall, portraits of Anwar Sadat and Konrad Adenauer, and a statue of Pallas Athene, helmeted and throwing a spear in the same bombastic style as his Nazi-era work. Breker's rehabilitation continued, culminating in the creation of a Breker museum, funded by the Bodenstein family, who set aside Schloss Nörvenich (between Aachen and Cologne) for the purpose. The Arno Breker Museum was inaugurated in 1985, and still open in 2021.

Breker's rehabilitation led to backlashes from anti-Nazi activists, including controversy in Paris when some of his works were exhibited at the Centre Georges Pompidou in 1981. In the same year anti-Breker demonstrations accompanied an exhibition in Berlin. Breker's admirers insisted that he had never been a supporter of Nazi ideology (despite being a member of the Nazi Party), but had simply accepted their patronage.

Breker's last major work was a monumental sculpture of Alexander the Great intended to be located in Greece.

Marriages and family
Arno Breker was married twice. His first wife, Demetra Messala, was a Greek model. She died in 1956 in a car accident. He remarried in 1958 to Charlotte Kluge. They had two children, Gerhart (1959) and Carola (1962). Breker remained married to Kluge until his death in 1991.

Portraits (mostly in bronze) 

 Baron von Mirbach, 1920
 Friedrich Ebert, Berlin 1924 (erster Staatsauftrag)
 Walter Kaesbach, Düsseldorf, 1925
 Artur Kaufmann, 1925
 Herbert Eulenberg, 1925/26
 Otto Dix, Paris 1926/27
 Isamu Noguchi, Paris 1927
 Hermann Kesser, 1927
 Moissey Kogan, Paris 1927/28
 Inge Davemann, 1928
 Albert Lindgens, 1928
 Walter Lindgens, 1928
 Illa Fudickar, 1929
 Robert Gerling, 1929
 Arnold von Guilleaume, 1929
 Jean Marchand, 1929
 Mossey Kogan, 1929
 H. R. von Langen, 1929
 Alberto Giacometti
 Isolde von Conta, 1930
 Abraham Frohwein, 1930
 Heinrich Heine, 1930
 Edith Arnthal, 1930/31
 Demetra Breker, 1931
 Nico Mazaraki, 1931
 Robert Valancey, Paris 1931
 Prince Georg of Bavaria, 1932
 Andreas von Siemens, Berlin 1932
 Nina Bausch, 1933
 Demetra Breker, 1933
 Olga von Dahlgreen, 1933
 Arthur Kampf, 1933
 Victor Manheimer, 1933
 Nora von Schnitzler, 1933
 Robert de Valencay, 1933

 Max Liebermann, 1934
 Gottfried Bermann Fischer, 1934
 Max Baldner, 1934
 Kurt Edzard, 1934
 Graf von Luckner, 1934
 Anne-Marie Merkel, 1934/35
 Pütze von Siemens, 1934/35
 Kurt Edzard, 1935
 Anne-Marie Merkel, 1935
 Pütze von Siemens, 1935/36
 Carl Friedrich von Siemens, 1936
 Leo von König, 1936
 Joseph Goebbels, 1937
 Paul von Hindenburg, 1937
 Wolfgang Reindl, 1938
 Adolf Hitler, 1938
 Richard Wagner, 1939
 Gerda Bormann (wife of Martin Bormann), 1940
 Edda Göring (daughter of Hermann Göring), 1941
 Albert Speer, 1941
 Margarete Speer (wife of Albert Speer), 1941
 Bernhard Rust
 Erika Baeumker (wife of Adolf Baeumker), approx 1941
 Gerhart Hauptmann, 1942
 Serge Lifar, 1942/43
 Aristide Maillol, 1942/43
 Alfred Cortot, 1942/43
 Abel Bonnard, 1943
 Wilhelm Kreis, 1943
 Maurice de Vlaminck, 1943
 Claude Flammarion, 1944
 Gottfried Ude-Bernays, 1945
 Johannes Bork, 1946

 Lothar Albano Müller, 1950
 Ludwig Hoelscher, 1952
 Gustav Lindemann, 1952
 Wilhelm Kempff, 1953
 Emperor Haile Selassie I of Ethiopia, 1955
 Rolf Gerling, 1956
 Hans Gerling
 Friedrich Sieburg, 1961
 Jean Cocteau, 1963
 Jean Marais, 1963
 Henry de Montherlant, 1964
 Marcel Pagnol, 1964
 Roger Peyrefitte, 1964
 Jeanne Castel, 1964
 Paul Morand, 1965
 Jacques Benoist-Méchin, 1965
 Henry Picker
 André Dunoyer de Segonzac, 1966
 Marcel Midy
 Ezra Pound, 1967
 King Mohammed V of Morocco
 Princess Ira von Fürstenberg
 Louis-Ferdinand Céline, 1970
 Salvador Dalí, 1974/75
 Ernst Fuchs, 1976/77
 Leopold Sedar Senghor, 1978
 Anwar El Sadat, 1980
 Ernst Jünger, 1981/82
 Richard Wagner, Cosima Wagner, Franz Liszt, 1982
 Heinrich Heine, 1983
 Peter und Irene Ludwig, 1986/1987
 Gerhard Hauptmann, 1988
 Arno Breker, Selfportrait, 1991

Sculptures 1935–1945 

 Prometheus (1935)
 Relief am Gebäude der Lebensversicherung Nordstern, Berlin (1936)
 Der Zehnkämpfer fürs Olympia-Stadion, Berlin (1936, Silvermedal)
 Die Siegerin fürs Olympia-Stadion, Berlin (1936)
 Dionysos fürs Olympia-Dorf, Berlin (1936)
 Der Verwundete (1938)
 Der Rosseführer (1938)
 Anmut (1938)
 Fackelträger („Die Partei") im Hof der Neuen Reichskanzlei (1939)
 Schwertträger („Die Wehrmacht") im Hof der Neuen Reichskanzlei (1939)
 Schreitende Pferde, Gartenfront, Neue Reichskanzlei (1939)
 Der Künder (1939)
 Der Wäger (1939)
 Bereitschaft (1939)
 Der Rächer (1940)
 Kameraden (1940), Breker-Museum
 Bannerträger (1940)
 Abschied (1940)
 Vernichtung (1940)
 Opfer (1940)
 Schreitende (1940)
 Der Wächter (1941)
 Psyche (1941)
 Berufung (1941)
 Der Sieger (1942)
 Kniende (1942)
 Eos (1942)
 Flora (1943)
 Heros (1943)

Reliefs 

 Der Genius (1938)
 Der Kämpfer (1938)
 Apollo und Daphne
 Auszug zum Kampf (1941)

 Aufbruch der Kämpfer (1940/41)
 Der Rufer (1941)
 Orpheus and Eurydice (1944, Breker-Museum)

Books by Breker 
 1983 – Schriften ("Writings")  Bonn: Marco-Edition .
 1987 – Begegnungen und Betrachtungen ("Encounters and Reflections") Bonn: Marco-Edition .
 2000 – Über allem Schönheit ("Above All Beauty") Arnshaugk.

Films and videos 
 Arno Breker – Harte Zeit, starke Kunst, by Arnold Fanck, Hans Cürlis, Riefenstahl-Film GmbH, Berlin (1944)
 Arno Breker – Skulpturen und Musik, by Marco J. Bodenstein, 20 minutes, Marco-Edition Bonn.
 Arno Breker – Deutsche Lebensläufe, Farbfilm 60 minutes, Marco-VG, Bonn.
 Paris-Rom-Berlin und Arno Breker, and Interview with Albert Speer. Farbfilm, 60 minutes, EKS Museum Europäische Kunst, Schloss 52388 Nörvenich.
 Zeit der Götter (1992)

See also 

 Art of the Third Reich
 Chantons sous l'Occupation (documentary film)
 Conrad Hommel
 Nazi architecture
 Werner Peiner
 Josef Thorak
 Adolf Wissel

References 
Notes

Further reading
 Bodenstein, Joe F. (2016). Arno Breker – une biographie. Paris: Èditions Séguier Paris.   
 Despiau, Charles (1942). Arno Breker. Paris: Edition Flammarion. 
 Egret, Dominique (1997). Arno Breker: Ein Leben für das Schöne. Berlin: Grabert Verlag. .
 Hirlé, Ronald (2010). Arno Breker – Sculpteur – Dessinateur – Architecte. Strasbourg and Paris: Editions Hirlè. 
 Klier, Hans (1978). Arno Breker – Form und Schönheit. Bonn: Salzburger Kulturvereinigung; Paris: Marco-Edition.
 
 Leber, Hermann (1998). Rodin, Breker, Hrdlicka 
 Möller, Uwe (2000). Arno Breker – Zeichnungen-Drawings-Dessins 1927–1990. Bonn: Marco Edition 
 Peyrefitte, Roger (1980). Hommage an Arno Breker. Paris: Marco-Edition. 
 Probst, Volker G. (1981). Der Bildhauer Arno Breker – Eine Untersuchung. Paris: Marco-Edition .
 Probst, Volker G. (1981). Das Bildnis des Menschen im Werk von Arno Breker Paris: Marco-Edition. .
 Probst, Volker G. (1985). Das Pietà-Motiv bei Arno Breker. Paris: Marco-Edition. 
 Schilling, Rolf (1994). Eros und Ares – Begegnung mit Breker. Munich: Edition Arnshaugk 
 Trimborn, Jürgen (2011). Arno Breker. Der Künstler und die Macht. Berlin: Aufbau-Verlag  
 Zavrel, B. John (1985). Arno Breker – His Art and Life. New York: West Art. 
 Zavrel, B. John and Ludwig, Peter (1990). Arno Breker - The Collected Writings. New York: West Art; Paris: Marco-Edition. 
 Zavrel, B. John and Webb, Benjiman D. (1982). Arno Breker – The Divine Beauty in Art. New York: West Art.

External links 

 Web museum
 Interview with Arno Breker conducted in 1979
 Arno Breker Museum Official Site (in German)
 Arno Breker Biography (in German)
 Arno Breker Life, Work and Relationships with Modern Writers and Artists (in French)
 Demetra Messala Article about Arno Breker's wife
 Arno Breker Appreciation Group

1900 births
1991 deaths
People from Elberfeld
Nazi Party politicians
German sculptors
Modern sculptors
People from the Rhine Province
Olympic silver medalists in art competitions
20th-century German sculptors
20th-century German male artists
German male sculptors
Medalists at the 1936 Summer Olympics
Olympic competitors in art competitions
Architects from Wuppertal